Hypernova is the second studio album by American metalcore band The Browning. It was released on October 1, 2013 through Earache Records and was produced by Andreas Magnusson.

Track listing

Personnel
The Browning
 Jonny McBee  – lead vocals, programming
 Collin Woroniak  – guitars, backing vocals
 Drew Ellis  – bass
 Cody Stewart  – drums

Additional personnel
 Andreas Magnusson  – production, engineering
 Andrew Roesch and Eric Rushing  – management

References 

2013 albums
Earache Records albums
The Browning albums